İsmet Özel (born 19 September 1944, in Kayseri) is a Turkish poet and writer.

Early years
Özel is a son of a police officer from Söke.  He attended primary and secondary school in Kastamonu, Çankırı and Ankara.  He attended classes at Political Science Faculty of Ankara University, and graduated from the French Language department of Hacettepe University.

Career
Özel published Halkın Dostları magazine with Ataol Behramoğlu.  Özel's songs of freedom derived its content from socialism but their structure and symbolism reflected the tastes of the Second New generation movement in Turkish poetry. In the 1970s, Özel developed a mystic and Islamist view which shocked his leftist audience.

He worked as a French lecturer in the State Conservatory. He spent all his time writing after he retired. Because of both his interesting character and works, he took an impressive place among his contemporaries.

Özel, who published his early poems in 1963, became salient with densely using images and his meticulous effort to choose words. He collected his early poems in the book called Geceleyin Bir Koşu (A Run in the Night, 1966), in which he searches the truth of being human. His attributions about gathering the innovations and experimental sides of Turkish Poetry with social realism and his success to realize it caused to his second book called Evet İsyan (Yes, Rebel, 1969) made big echoes.

In 1970, he published Halkın Dostları review with Ataol Behramoğlu. In fact, Ataol Behramoğlu purified his poetry by leaving out crude propaganda and naive didacticism. İsmet Özel, perhaps the most talented of the group, turned to Islam for inspiration, but preserved the revolutionary bravura of his Marxist days. In following years, İsmet Özel experienced great changes in his political and philosophical approaches, and dedicated himself to the Islamic thought.

When asked by his friend Murat Belge, a noted socialist intellectual, the reason for his conversion, Özel replied, "a man looks either after his freedom or his security, but he cannot acquire one without the other. All my life has been a search for ontological security. I am convinced that I found this security in the Qur'an. Islam is a healing for me. Those who either have no wounds or are not aware of their wounds will have no need for this healing." However, Özel is convinced that mankind is sick. In Three Problems: Technology, Civilization and Alienation and in To Speak in Difficult Times and also It Is Prohibited to Eat the Stones, Özel argues that mankind is from an acute alienation which is a result of destructive technology, artificial division of man and nature, and the enlightened principles of Islam which emphasize the synthesis of the sacred and the profane is the only medicine available for this disease. Three Problems is one of the most influential books of recent times in Turkey.

Another following twenty years, he claimed that he broke the ties with the Islamic Media. His third work called Cinayetler Kitabı (The Book of Murders, 1975) was a perfect example of his quality in writing poems which it emphasizes the dedication to his early works.

In addition to putting his understanding of poetry, the book called Şiir Okuma Kılavuzu (The Handbook of Reading a Poem, 1980) also points an still being a research field: the contemporary position of Turkish Poetry.

In the book called Celladıma Gülümserken (When I Smile at My Executioner, 1984), the main borders of İsmet Özel's poetic world clarified, he collected all his poems in the book Erbain / Kırk Yılın Şiirleri (Erbain - The Poems of 40 Years, 1987).

Except newspaper works, starting from 1960, he published his poems and works in Devinim 60, Papirüs, Yeni Dergi, Şiir Sanatı, Halkın Dostları (1964–71), Diriliş, Mavera, Gösteri, etc.

The most notable of these is undoubtedly the column he had in newspapers of Yeni Devir (1977–79 and 1981–82), beginning from 1981-82 / 1985 partially in the Millî Gazete, moreover also in the Yeni Şafak newspaper.

Both in these works and his first essay book called Üç Mesele (In Three Problems: Technology, Civilization and Alienation) (1978), he defended that Muslims had to be dependent to the Islamic sources itself. He claimed that this is the most realistic and rightful effort in the conditions that is far and away from Islamic Sources.

He won the Writers' Union Turkey's Essay Award (1985) and Chilean poet Gabriela Mistral Award (1995) with his book Taşları Yemek Yasak (It Is Prohibited to Eat the Stones).

He told his views about intellectual agenda in the television program İsmet Özel'le Başbaşa (Alone with İsmet Özel) which was hosted by İsmail Kara on Channel 7.

Özel has aimed at a new awareness of social responsibilities. In the 1970s, he adopted a mystical view of life without losing the strength of expression and inventiveness which he had evolved during his socialist period.

He has drawn upon his knowledge of Western philosophy, Marxist sociology, and radical Islamist political theory to advocate a modern Islamic perspective that does not hesitate to criticize genuine societal ills while simultaneously remaining faithful to the ethical values and spiritual dimensions of religion.

Özel, a Marxist convert to Islam: "I did not consider myself a part of the society I was in—but as a candidate for the courageous and uncompromising defense of the cause of the just."

İsmet Özel, an ex-Marxist convert and the most prominent Islamist intellectual, argued that it was Atatürk's reforms that, ironically Islamicized Turkey by forcing people to internalize and value their religious identity and not simply take it for granted as in the past.

According to him, "Muslim is a terrorist. The first duty of the Muslim is to be a terrorist. Infidels will be afraid of Muslims. When they are not afraid, a Muslim is not a Muslim." He stated that "I accept that by being a Muslim, the entire non-Muslim world is lower than me. So I am a Muslim and everyone who is not a Muslim is a lower person than me. As with all other religions, they can only be tolerated as a human, if not Muslim."

He wrote a poem titled, Of not being a Jew, in which he lamented the fact that he felt like a pursued Jew, but had no second country to go to. "Your load is heavy / He's very heavy / Just because he's your brother / Your brothers are your pogroms / When you reach the doorsteps of your friends / Starts your Diaspora," he wrote.

"As a political system in Turkey, socialism is possible, Turkism is probable, Islam is certain", however in a recent article he defended the isolation of Muslims from the society unless they adapt to the secular democracy, and emphasized Islam as a political system in Turkey is dead.

Bibliography

Poetry
Geceleyin Bir Koşu (A Run in the Night)
Evet, İsyan (Yes, Rebellion)
Cinayetler Kitabı (The Book of Murders)
Celladıma Gülümserken (When I Smile at My Executioner)
Erbain (The Poems of 40 Years)
Bir Yusuf Masalı (A Yusef Fairytale)
Çatlıycak Kadar Aşkî (Enough Love to Crack)
Of Not Being A Jew

Books
Üç Mesele (Three Problems)
Zor Zamanda Konuşmak (Speaking in Hard Times)
Taşları Yemek Yasak (It is Prohibited to Eat the Stones)
Bakanlar ve Görenler (Lookers and Seers)
Faydasız Yazılar (Useless Writings)
İrtica Elden Gidiyor (Reaction is Getting Out of Hand)
Surat Asmak Hakkımız (Our Right to Frown)
Tehdit Değil Teklif (An Offer Not a Threat)
Waldo Sen Neden Burada Değilsin? (Waldo, Why Aren't You Here?)
Sorulunca Söylenen (Things That are Said When Asked)
Cuma Mektupları - 1 (Juma Letters -1)
Cuma Mektupları - 2
Cuma Mektupları - 3
Cuma Mektupları - 4
Cuma Mektupları - 5
Cuma Mektupları - 6
Cuma Mektupları - 7
Cuma Mektupları - 8
Cuma Mektupları - 9
Cuma Mektupları - 10
Tahrir Vazifeleri (Tahrir Missions)
Neyi Kaybettiğini Hatırla (Remember What You've Lost)
Ve'l-Asr
Tavşanın Randevusu (The Date of the Rabbit)
Bilinç Bile İlginç (Even the Conscious is Interesting)
Şiir Okuma Kılavuzu (Guide to Reading Poetry)
40 Hadis (40 Hadith)
Henry Sen Neden Buradasın-1 (Henry, Why Are You Here?-1)
Henry Sen Neden Buradasın-2 (Henry, Why Are You Here?-2)
Kalıntürk (Thickturk)
Çenebazlık (Roistering)
Şairin Devriye Nöbeti 1 - Tok Kurda Puslu Hava (Poet's Patrol Duty 1 - A Smoky Day for a Satiated Wolf)
Şairin Devriye Nöbeti 2 - Bileşenleriyle Basit (Poet's Patrol Duty 2 - Simple with Its Components)
Şairin Devriye Nöbeti 3 - Neredeyizim (Poet's Patrol Duty 3 - Whereareweism)
Şairin Devriye Nöbeti 4 - Ebruli Külah (Poet's Patrol Duty 4 - Mottled Cap)
Şairin Devriye Nöbeti 5 - Evet mi Hayır mı? Sınıf Savaşı Evet Milli Mücadele Hayır (Poet's Patrol Duty 5 - Yes or No? Yes to Class Battles No to National Struggle)

Interview and Letters
Sorulunca Söylenen
Genç Bir Şairden Genç Bir Şaire Mektuplar (Letters from a Young Poet to a Young Poet, correspondence with Ataol Behramoğlu, 1995),

Translations
Siyasi Felsefenin Büyük Düşünürleri (Great Political Thinkers by William Ebenstein)
Gariplerin Kitabı (The Book of Strangers by Ian Dallas) 
Osmanlı İmparatorlugu ve İslami Gelenek (Ottoman Empire and Islamic Tradition by Norman Itzkowitz)
Bilim Kutsal Bir İnektir (Science is a sacred cow by Anthony Standen)

References

External links
  On his life and poetry

1944 births
People from Kayseri
Ankara University alumni
Converts to Islam from atheism or agnosticism
Turkish Islamists
Living people
Turkish writers